Alexander or Alex Walker may refer to:

Sports
 Alexander Walker (cricketer) (1842-1903), Scottish cricketer
 Alex Walker (footballer, born 1881) (1881–1916), Scottish footballer
 Alex Walker (footballer, born 1984), Scottish footballer
 Alex Walker (rugby union, born 1984), Australian rugby union player
 Alex Walker (rugby union, born 1986), Welsh rugby union player
 Alex Walker (rugby league) (born 1995), Scotland rugby league player

Other
 Alexander Walker (physiologist) (1779–1852), Scottish physiologist
 Alexander Walker (1837–1889), British businessman
 Alexander Walker II (1869–1950), British businessman
 Alexander Walker (critic) (1930–2003), film critic
 Alexander Walker (conductor) (born 1973), British conductor
 Alexander Walker (MP) for Lichfield
 Alexander Stuart Walker (1826–1896), Justice of the Supreme Court of Texas
 Alex Walker (The Dumping Ground character), character on The Dumping Ground portrayed by Connor Lawson

See also 
Alexander Walker Scott (1800–1883), Australian entomologist
Alexander Walker Ogilvie (1829–1902), Canadian politician
Nickeil Alexander-Walker (born 1998), Canadian basketball player